Philippe Bovy was a Belgian boxer and Olympian. He competed in the 1920 Olympic Summer Games in Antwerp. In the Men's featherweight tournament, he was awarded a bye in the Round of 32, defeated Wim Hesterman in the Round of 16, but was eliminated in the quarterfinals by Jean Gachet of France.

References

Olympic boxers of Belgium
Boxers at the 1920 Summer Olympics
Year of death missing
Year of birth missing
Belgian male boxers
Featherweight boxers